The Andorran Athletics Championships is an annual outdoor track and field competition organised by the Andorran Athletics Federation, which serves as the national championship for the sport in Andorra.

Events
The competition programme varies depending on the level of participation and several globally common athletics events are typically missing from the programme due to a lack of entries or organisational limitations. Unlike most national outdoor competitions, Andorran runners contest the 3000 metres rather than 5000 metres distance. Below are the events regularly held at the competition:

Track running
100 metres, 200 metres, 400 metres, 800 metres, 1500 metres, 3000 metres
Distance running
10K run, half marathon, cross country running
Obstacle events
100 metres hurdles (women only), 400 metres hurdles
Jumping events
Pole vault, high jump, long jump
Throwing events
Shot put, discus throw, javelin throw, hammer throw

Men's champions

100 metres
2001: Javier Rodríguez
2002: Sergi Vidal
2003: Patrick Montané
2004: Oriol Guillem
2005: Oriol Guillem
2006: Oriol Guillem

200 metres
2001: Javier Rodríguez
2002: Sergi Vidal
2003: Javier Rodríguez
2004: Oriol Guillem
2005: Bernat Villela
2006: Ángel Miret

400 metres
2001: Jordi Martínez
2002: Farid Arrahaoui
2003: Víctor Martínez
2004: Sergi Vidal
2005: Víctor Martínez
2006: Eric Rossell

800 metres
2001: Víctor Martínez
2002: Josep Sansa
2003: Daniel Maciel
2004: Víctor Martínez
2005: Josep Graells
2006: Víctor Martínez

1500 metres
2001: Pere Cornella
2002: Antoni Bernadó
2003: Pere Cornella
2004: Antoni Bernadó
2005: Josep Sansa
2006: Antoni Bernadó

3000 metres
2003: Antoni Bernadó
2004: Antoni Bernadó
2005: Antoni Bernadó
2006: Antoni Bernadó

5000 metres
2001: Manuel Fernandes
2002: Antoni Bernadó

10K run
2001: Antoni Bernadó
2002: ?
2003: Antoni Bernadó
2004: Antoni Bernadó
2005: Antoni Bernadó

Half marathon
2001: Antoni Bernadó
2002: Alonso López
2003: Josep Sansa
2004: Not held
2005: Antoni Bernadó

400 metres hurdles
2002: Jordi Martínez
2003: Not held
2004: Not held
2005: Marc Medina
2006: Marc Medina

High jump
2001: Óscar Chinchilla
2002: Óscar Chinchilla
2003: Bernat Vilella
2004: Esteve Martín
2005: Esteve Martín
2006: Oriol Guillem

Pole vault
2001: Xavier Consegal
2002: Xavier Consegal
2003: Bernat Vilella
2004: Bernat Vilella
2005: Robert Aleu
2006: Bernat Vilella

Long jump
2001: Óscar Chinchilla
2002: Óscar Chinchilla
2003: Patrick Montané
2004: Esteve Martín
2005: Ángel Miret
2006: Not held

Triple jump
2001: Xavier Consegal
2002: Jordi Raya
2003: Not held
2004: Not held
2005: Not held
2006: Not held

Shot put
2001: Unai Olea
2002: Ángel Moreno
2003: Not held
2004: Joan Fernández
2005: Carlos Queirós
2006: Carlos Queirós

Discus throw
2001: Ángel Moreno
2002: Ángel Moreno
2003: Ángel Moreno
2004: Ángel Moreno
2005: Ángel Moreno
2006: Carlos Queirós

Hammer throw
2001: Joan Valls
2002: Joan Valls
2003: Not held
2004: Not held
2005: Not held
2006: Joan Valls

Javelin throw
2001: Adrià Pérez
2002: Adrià Pérez
2003: Adrià Pérez
2004: Adrià Pérez
2005: Carlos Queirós
2006: Adrià Pérez

Cross country
2001: Antoni Bernadó
2002: Joan Ramón Moya
2003: Víctor Martínez
2004: Joan Ramón Moya
2005: Antoni Bernadó
2006: Antoni Bernadó

Women's champions

100 metres
2001: Montserrat Pujol
2002: Roser Mazón
2003: Sara Guerra
2004: Montserrat Pujol
2005: Carmen Fernández
2006: Montserrat Pujol

200 metres
2001: Carme Domenjó
2002: Imma Sabaté
2003: Sónia González
2004: Sara Guerra
2005: Roser Mazón
2006: Sónia Villacampa

400 metres
2001: Not held
2002: Eva Iglesias
2003: Imma Sabaté
2004: Sílvia Rossell
2005: Roser Mazón
2006: Natàlia Gallego

800 metres
2001: María Betriu
2002: Eva Iglesias
2003: Sílvia Felipo
2004: Eva Iglesias
2005: Natàlia Gallego
2006: Natàlia Gallego

1500 metres
2001: María Betriu
2002: Sílvia Felipo
2003: Sílvia Felipo
2004: no finishers
2005: Not held
2006: Natàlia Gallego

3000 metres
2002: Sílvia Felipo
2003: Sílvia Felipo
2004: Not held
2005: Not held
2006: Natàlia Gallego

5000 metres
2001: María Betriu

10K run
2001: Estefanía Jiménez
2002: ?
2003: Eva Iglesias
2004: Not held
2005: Gemma Reig

Half marathon
2001: Eva Iglesias
2002: María Betriu
2003: María Betriu
2004: Not held
2005: Estefanía Jiménez

2000 metres steeplechase
2005: Gemma Iglesias

100 metres hurdles
2001: Not held
2002: Montserrat Pujol
2003: Not held
2004: Not held
2005: Not held
2006: Montserrat Pujol

400 metres hurdles
2001: Not held
2002: Elsa Santos
2003: Elsa Santos
2004: no finishers
2005: Not held
2006: Dina Chiguen

High jump
2001: Nerea Coto
2002: Montserrat Pujol
2003: Montserrat Pujol
2004: Margarida Moreno
2005: Margarida Moreno
2006: Margarida Moreno

Pole vault
2001: Laura Rossell
2002: Laura Rossell
2003: Laura Rossell
2004: María Martínez
2005: María Martínez
2006: Barbara Coma

Long jump
2001: Montserrat Pujol
2002: Vicky Barberà
2003: Montserrat Pujol
2004: Montserrat Pujol
2005: Montserrat Pujol
2006: Not held

Triple jump
2001: Vicky Barberà
2002: Montserrat Pujol
2003: Montserrat Pujol
2004: Montserrat Pujol
2005: Montserrat Pujol
2006: Not held

Shot put
2001: Montserrat Pujol
2002: Lorena Álvarez
2003: Not held
2004: Joana Santamaría
2005: Lorena Álvarez
2006: Lorena Álvarez

Discus throw
2001: Not held
2002: Elena Villalón
2003: Elena Villalón
2004: Joana Santamaría
2005: Not held
2006: Elena Villalón

Hammer throw
2001: Elena Villalón
2002: Tania González
2003: Elena Villalón
2004: Elena Villalón
2005: Elena Villalón
2006: Elena Villalón

Javelin throw
2001: Not held
2002: Vicky Barberà
2003: Not held
2004: Not held
2005: Laura Rossell
2006: Montserrat Pujol

Cross country
2001: María Betriu
2002: María Betriu
2003: Estefanía Jiménez
2004: Eva Iglesias
2005: Eva Iglesias
2006: Eva Iglesias

References

Athletics in Andorra
Sports competitions in Andorra
National athletics competitions
Athletics